Brady Smith (born December 29, 1971) is an American actor and author.

Career
Smith has appeared on various television series, including ER (1994), JAG (1995), Charmed (1998), Judging Amy (1999), CSI: Miami (2002), The Comeback (2005), The Mentalist (2009), White Collar (2011), Criminal Minds (2014) and Alexa & Katie (2020) as Joe.

In 2010, Smith starred in the Hallmark Channel television movie Ice Dreams, and starred as Matt Thompson in the television movie The Jensen Project. In 2013 he was cast in the MTV television series Happyland. Smith played the father of the titular character in the 2016 television movie The Perfect Daughter.

Personal life
Smith was born in Houston, Texas, and graduated from Stephen F. Austin State University in 1994. On July 9, 2005, he married actress Tiffani Thiessen. They have two children, a daughter and a son.

References

External links

1971 births
American male television actors
Artists from Texas
Male actors from Houston
Living people
Stephen F. Austin State University alumni